Oscar Eduardo Ramírez Aguilar (born 13 October 1973) is a Mexican politician affiliated with the MORENA. He served as Deputy of the 62nd Legislature of the Mexican Congress representing Chiapas between 31 August 2012 until 16 July 2013.

References

1973 births
Living people
Members of the Chamber of Deputies (Mexico)
Ecologist Green Party of Mexico politicians
21st-century Mexican politicians
People from Comitán
Politicians from Chiapas